Exocannibalism (from Greek exo-, "from outside" and cannibalism, "to eat humans"), as opposed to endocannibalism, is the consumption of flesh outside one's close social group—for example, eating one's enemy. When done ritually, it has been associated with being a means of imbibing valued qualities of the victim or as an act of final violence against the deceased in the case of sociopathy, as well as a symbolic expression of the domination of an enemy in warfare. Such practices have been documented in cultures including the Aztecs from Mexico, the Carib and the Tupinambá from South America.

Historically, it has also been used as a practical expediency in especially desperate attritional or guerrilla warfare when the extreme hunger and the abundance of humans being killed coincide to create conditions ripe for cannibalism. Some viewed the practice of exocannibalism  as an act of predation tying the action to more of a prey versus predator scenario than one of ceremonial meaning. Exocannibalism has also historically been viewed as a way to acquire the strength and ability of a defeated enemy. It serves as a final act to either intake or extinguish the existence of an enemy. Notably, the cultures that view exocannibalism as a form of predation do not view the act as taboo.

Cultural practice
Cannibalism is something that has been found wherever and whenever humans have formed societies. Traditionally, accounts of cannibalism were found embedded in myths and folklore as a common motive that indicated people were less than fully human. Exocannibalism in the form of eating enemies is usually done to express hostility and domination toward the victim. The perpetrator eats their victim to inflict ultimate indignity and humiliation. It has also been practiced along with headhunting and scalping to display war trophies. John Kantner, an archaeologist who studied alleged cannibalism in the American Southwest, believes that when resources decrease the competition of societies increased and exocannibalism can ensue. Exocannibalism would generally be considered to be the opposite of endocannibalism, but they are both forms of ritual cannibalism. There have been no previous accounts of a culture practicing both forms of ritual cannibalism, aside from a recent study that confirmed the Wari', an Amazonian tribe in Brazil, practiced both forms.

List of cultures known for exocannibalism
 Africa
 Lendu
Asia
Batak
Dyak
Europe
Sawney Bean's clan
North America
Iroquois
Nuuchahnulth (Nootka)
Ancestral Puebloans (Anasazi)
Aztecs
South America
Tupinambá
Wari'
Oceania
Marquesans
Mianmin
Asmat
Fijians
Maori

Wariʼ 
The Wariʼ people of South America are known for their practice of both endocannibalism and exocannibalism. Endocannibalism had the ability to serve as a form of recognition and respect for the dead. Exocannibalism on the other hand was part of warfare. The Wariʼ had very separate motives behind why they performed each of these modes of cannibalism but both forms had the same basic steps of roasting either flesh or bone and then eating it. Wariʼ warriors would kill enemies such as the Brazilians, Bolivians, and members of enemy tribes. The Wariʼ consumed these enemies as a means of transforming them into a form of prey. They viewed warfare cannibalism as a form of predation or hunting. They used exocannibalism as a means by which to label their enemies as subhuman and make their flesh as unimportant as that of any other animal that was typically killed for food. This practice of cannibalism was continued by the Wariʼ people until the 1960s.

Fiji 
The people of Fiji are also documented as having participated in exocannibalism as a form of ritualistic behavior, though history of this is typically hidden by European modification. From Fijian legend, the development of the island was due to a god who brought with him cannibalism and warfare. When he arrived on the island, he then married into the single indigenous family. That family then populated the island. This legend along with cannibalism continued into the reality of Fijian people. During wartime, chiefs were able to have their pick of the warriors and soldiers who were killed, seeking out the most famous of those slain. The rest of the soldiers killed that the chief did not want would be consumed by the rest of the common people. This form of consumption of the dead was not out of need but instead served as a means by which to assert their power over a conquered people. Consumption of human flesh was not viewed as taboo, but instead was viewed as an act of dining with the gods or dining on the food of gods. Along with consuming the flesh to show domination over slain enemies, cannibalism was also part of both political and religious rituals performed by the Fijian people. Cannibalism persisted in the Fijian culture because of the cultural beliefs regarding it.

See also
 List of incidents of cannibalism

References
 Biasing Cannibalism in Anthropology by Robyn Neufeldt (2012)

Cannibalism
Anthropology